SBF may refer to:

Organizations

Academic 
 Brazilian Physical Society (Sociedade Brasileira de Física)
 Faculty of Political Science, Ankara University (Ankara Üniversitesi Siyasal Bilgiler Fakültesi), Turkey
 Société botanique de France, French botanical society
 Studium Biblicum Franciscanum, Franciscan Bible researchers based in Jerusalem

Athletic
 Seychelles Basketball Federation, organiser of the Seychelles Basketball League
 Stix, Baer and Fuller F.C., a soccer team

Other organizations
 Saint Barbara Foundation, a mine clearance organization in Germany 
 SBF Visa Group, Italian amusement ride manufacturer
 Scottish Building Federation
 Singapore Business Federation
 , predecessor to Euronext Paris
 Springboard Foundation, Philippine charity
 Stix Baer & Fuller, former store chain, St. Louis, Missouri, US

Science and technology
 Short backfire antenna
 Simulated body fluid
 Surface brightness fluctuation, in astrophysics

Transportation
 Sardeh Band Airport, Afghanistan (IATA airport code)
 Small Block Ford, engine series
 St Budeaux Ferry Road railway station, Devon, England (National Rail station code)
 Fairchild SBF, WWII dive bomber
 Grumman XSBF, 1930s prototype dive-bomber

Other uses
 Sam Bankman-Fried (born 1992), US cryptocurrency businessman, former billionaire, and suspected fraudster
 SBF 120, French stock market index
 Shabo language of Ethiopia